A purse hook (also known as a  handbag hook or handbag hanger) is a type of hook meant to temporarily secure a purse or handbag to a table, sink or armrest. Such hooks have been available since the 1920s. Queen Elizabeth II was said to employ an S-shaped one to hang her handbags on.

Reasons for use
The practical uses are numerous; hanging a purse, bag, groceries, umbrella or any item that can be hung and needs to be kept close, for convenient access or to discourage theft.

A bag placed on the floor in a restaurant or bathroom will collect bacteria, fungi, and viruses.

In Brazil there is a superstition that a woman will lose all of her money if she puts her purse on the floor.

Types 
There are at least five types of purse hooks available. The order is based on patent file dates.

 The original L style type with a circular pad and a rigid bent wire.
 The link type with circular pad and a set links that either wrap around the pad or make a "hook"
 A spring closing bracelet type
 A twisting ring type
 An S-shaped purse hanger

Gallery of purse hook types

Notes

External links

Fashion accessories
Consumer goods